"Dune Buggy" is a song by the American alternative rock band The Presidents of the United States of America, released as the fourth and final single from their self-titled debut album (1995) on July 8, 1996. The song reached number two in Iceland, number 15 in the United Kingdom, number 16 in Australia, and number 29 in Ireland.

Track listings
Initial pressing
 "Dune Buggy" – 2:45
 "Back Porch" (live) – 2:58
 "Kick Out the Jams" (live) – 2:30
 "Video Killed the Radio Star" (live) – 3:49

US promo
 "Dune Buggy" (video edit) – 2:44
 "Dune Buggy" (LP version) – 3:08
 "Show Us Your ID"

Australian Tour EP
 "Dune Buggy" (video edit) – 2:44
 "Dune Buggy" (LP version) – 3:08
 "Back Porch" (live) – 2:58
 "Video Killed the Radio Star" (live) – 3:49
 "Confusion" – 2:45

Charts

Weekly charts

Year-end charts

References

1995 songs
1996 singles
Columbia Records singles
Music videos directed by Roman Coppola
The Presidents of the United States of America (band) songs
Songs written by Chris Ballew